Giuseppe Porcelli may refer to:

Giuseppe Porelli: 20th-century Italian movie actor
Giuseppe Porcelli (Baroque painter): born in Messina, 1682